is a Japanese film director best known for directing The Taste of Tea (2004), Funky Forest (2005), and Smuggler (2011).

Career 
After graduating from Musashino Art University, Ishii got a job at Tohokushinsha Film and began directing commercials in 1992, receiving numerous awards in this field. His first short film, The Promise of August, shot in 1995, received the Japanese Film Grand Prix in the Fantastic Video Section of the 1995 Yubari International Fantastic Film Festival 

He made his feature debut with Shark Skin Man and Peach Hip Girl, based on the visual novel by cult manga artist Minetaro Mochizuki and starring regular collaborator Tadanobu Asano.

Ishii quickly followed his success with another box office hit, Party 7 (2000), which featured Masatoshi Nagase, Yoshio Harada and Tadanobu Asano among others. Between the years 2001 and 2002, he created a series of short films including the 3D animated dialogue piece Hal & Bons and the 2D animated space opera Trava Fist Planet. Among other commercials and select TV projects including the short Black Room which starred Takuya Kimura, and Music Power Go Go!, He collaborated with Production I.G for the animation sequence of Quentin Tarantino's Kill Bill: Volume 1.

In 2004, his fourth feature film The Taste of Tea won Best Feature Film at the Hawaii International Film Festival. In 2006, he co-directed the feature film Funky Forest  with fellow Japanese film makers and old school friends Shunichiro Miki and ANIKI. He founded his own production company, Nice Rainbow, in October 2006.

Selected filmography
Shark Skin Man and Peach Hip Girl (1999) starring Tadanobu Asano
Party 7 (2000) starring Tadanobu Asano
Trava Fist Planet episode 1 (2001–2002, short series, animation)
The Taste of Tea (2004) starring Tadanobu Asano, Maya Banno, Takahiro Sato, Tomokazu Miura, Anna Tsuchiya
Funky Forest (2005) starring Tadanobu Asano, Susumu Terajima, Ryō Kase, Rinko Kikuchi
Yama no Anata (2008, remake of 1938 film The Masseurs and a Woman)
Redline (2009)
Smuggler (2011)

References

External links

 

Japanese film directors
Living people
1966 births
People from Niigata Prefecture